The D16 class are a class of diesel locomotives built by English Electric, Rocklea for Australian Iron & Steel's, Port Kembla steelworks between 1959 and 1964.

History
D16 was one of the fleet of Locomotives that was built with more engine power than D1 class with 12 delivered between 1959 and 1964 to haul trains on Australian Iron & Steel's, Port Kembla network.

All leased to Pacific National in August 2007 when BlueScope outsourced the operation of its rail network. The locomotives remained the property of BlueScope Steel. The remaining examples are expected to be withdrawn in 2014.

References

BHP Billiton diesel locomotives
Bo-Bo locomotives
English Electric locomotives
Diesel locomotives of New South Wales
Pacific National diesel locomotives
Railway locomotives introduced in 1959
Standard gauge locomotives of Australia
Diesel-electric locomotives of Australia